Robstown Independent School District is a public school district based in Robstown, Texas, USA.

In addition to Robstown, the district also serves the community of Spring Garden-Terra Verde and part of La Paloma-Lost Creek.

In 2009, the school district was rated "academically acceptable" by the Texas Education Agency.

Schools

Secondary
Robstown Early College High School
Salazar Crossroads Academy
Seale Junior High School
Ortiz Intermediate School

Elementary
Robert Driscoll, Dr. Elementary School
Lotspeich Elementary School
San Pedro Elementary School

Prekindergarten
Hattie Martin Early Childhood Center

References

External links
 

School districts in Nueces County, Texas